Barabás is a village in Szabolcs-Szatmár-Bereg county, in the Northern Great Plain region of eastern Hungary.

Jews settled in Barabás in the middle of the 19th century. The synagogue of the Orthodox community was built in 1910. There is a Jewish cemetery on the site.

In 1944, after the German occupation, all the Jews of the village were deported to the Auschwitz extermination camp; only two of them survived after the war.

Geography

References

External links
 The jewish community in Barabás On JewishGen website. 

Populated places in Szabolcs-Szatmár-Bereg County
Hungary–Ukraine border crossings
Jewish communities destroyed in the Holocaust